Fengabine (SL-79,229) is a drug which was investigated as an antidepressant but was never marketed. Its mechanism of action is unknown, but its antidepressant effects are reversed by GABAA receptor antagonists like bicuculline and it has hence been labeled as GABAergic; however, it does not actually bind to GABA receptors, nor does it inhibit GABA-T. In clinical trials, fengabine's efficacy was comparable to that of the tricyclic antidepressants, but with a more rapid onset of action and much less side effects. Notably, fengabine lacks any sedative effects.

See also 
 Pivagabine
Tolgabide 
Progabide

References 

Chlorobenzenes
Imines
Phenols
Drugs with unknown mechanisms of action